Ewa Piątkowska (born 16 September 1984) is a Polish female professional boxer. She held the WBC female super welterweight title twice between 2016 and 2018. At regional level she held the European female welterweight title in 2015. As of November 2019, she is ranked as the world's third best active female super welterweight by BoxRec.

Professional boxing record

References

External links
 

Living people
1984 births
Polish women boxers
People from Radom
Welterweight boxers
20th-century Polish women
21st-century Polish women